Ricardo Peralta y Fabi (August 15, 1950 – December 31, 2017) was a Mexican mechanical engineer and former astronaut trainee who was a backup for astronaut Rodolfo Neri Vela on STS-61-B. Peralta was one of three people selected among 400 applicants to the Mexican space program.

Accident

Peralta was the alternate of the first Mexican astronaut Rodoflo Neri Vela at the time of the ultralight accident (bought as remuneration for astronaut training), in which he was seriously injured. He was unable to complete astronaut training and training at Indiana University.   He left the corps of astronauts on 3 December 1985.

He taught at the University in Mexico City for many years after his astronaut career and died in 2016.

See also
 List of Hispanic astronauts

References

1950 births
2017 deaths
Mexican mechanical engineers